Acacia melanoxylon, commonly known as the Australian blackwood, is an Acacia species native in South eastern Australia. The species is also known as blackwood, hickory, mudgerabah, Tasmanian blackwood, or blackwood acacia. The tree belongs to the Plurinerves section of Acacia and is one of the most wide-ranging tree species in eastern Australia and is quite variable mostly in the size and shape of the phyllodes.

Description
It has deeply fissured, dark-grey to black coloured bark that appears quite scaly on older trees. It has angular and ribbed branches. The bark on older trunks is dark greyish-black in colour, deeply fissured and somewhat scaly. Younger branches are glabrous, ribbed and angular to flattened near the greenish coloured tips. The stems of younger plants are occasionally hairy. Like most species of Acacia it has phyllodes rather than true leaves. They most often have a narrowly elliptic to lanceolate shape and are straight to slightly curved and often taper near the base and have three to five prominent longitudinal veins.

In its native area it blooms between July and December producing inflorescences that appear in groups of two to eight on an axillary raceme. Following flowering smooth, firmly papery and glabrous seed pods form.

Taxonomy
The species was first formally described by the botanist Robert Brown in 1813 as a part of the William Aiton work Hortus Kewensis. It was reclassified as Racosperma melanoxylon by Leslie Pedley in 1986 then returned to genus Acacia in 2006. Several other synonyms are known including Acacia arcuata, Mimosa melanoxylon and Acacia melanoxylon var. obtusifolia.

Distribution
In its native range the tree is found down the east coast of Australia from Queensland in the north, down the east coast into New South Wales, through Victoria and west along the south coast of South Australia. It is also found down the east coast of Tasmania. It has become naturalised in Western Australia.  In New South Wales it is widespread from coastal area and into the Great Dividing Range but is not found further inland. It is commonly found at higher altitudes to the Nandewar Range, Liverpool Range and around Orange in the west and is mostly found as a part of wet sclerophyll forest communities or near cooler rainforest communities. The range of the pant extends from the Atherton Tableland in northern Queensland in the north and follows the coast to around the Mount Lofty Range in the South Australia in the south west and can grow in a wide range of podsols especially in sandy loams.

Timber
Acacia melanoxylon is valued for its decorative timber which may be used in cabinets, musical instruments and in boatbuilding.

Appearance
Sapwood may range in colour from straw to grey-white with clear demarcation from the heartwood. The heartwood is golden to dark brown with chocolate growth rings. The timber is generally straight grained but may be wavy or interlocked. Quartersawn surfaces may produce an attractive fiddleback figure. The wood is lustrous and possesses a fine to medium texture.

The name of the wood may refer to dark stains on the hands of woodworkers, caused by the high levels of tannin in the timber.

Properties
Acacia melanoxylon timber has a density of approximately 660 kg/m3 and is strong in compression, resistant to impact and is moderately stiff. It is moderately blunting to work with tools and bends well. It may be nailed or screwed with ease, but gluing may produce variable results. The wood is easily stained and produces a high-quality finish.

Australian blackwood seasons easily with some possible cupping when boards are inadequately restrained. The timber produces little movement once seasoned.

The timber may be attacked by furniture beetles, termites and powder-post beetles (sapwood). It is resistant to effective preservative treatments.

Invasive species 
It has been introduced to many countries for forestry plantings and as an ornamental tree. It now is present in Africa, Asia, Europe, Indian Ocean, the Pacific Ocean, South America and the United States. It is a declared noxious weed species in South Africa and is a pest in Portugal's Azores Islands.  It was also recently listed by the California Invasive Plant Council (Cal-IPC) as an invasive weed that may cause limited impact (Knapp 2003). Its use as a street tree is being phased out in some locales because of the damage it often causes to pavements and underground plumbing.  In some regions of Tasmania, blackwood is now considered a pest.

Uses 
Indigenous Australians derive an analgesic from the tree. It was also used to make spear-throwers and shields.

The wood has many uses including wood panels, furniture, fine cabinetry, tools, boats, inlaid boxes and wooden kegs.  It is approximately the same quality as walnut, and is well-suited for shaping with steam.  The bark has a tannin content of about 20%. It may also be used for producing decorative veneers.

The tree's twigs and bark are used to poison fish as a way of fishing. This tree can also be used as a fire barrier plant, amongst other plants, in rural situations.

Plain and figured Australian blackwood is used in musical instrument making (in particular guitars, drums, Hawaiian ukuleles, violin bows and organ pipes), and in recent years has become increasingly valued as a substitute for koa wood.

References

Notes

General references 
Cal-IPC Plant Assessment Form (https://web.archive.org/web/20070927131037/http://portal.cal-ipc.org/files/PAFs/Acacia%20melanoxylon.pdf)

External links 

Acacia melanoxylon

https://web.archive.org/web/20070928160933/http://www.ellisguitars.com/AustralianBlackwood.html Musical instrument maker utilizing Acacia melanoxylon
https://web.archive.org/web/20090526074902/http://www.fidockdrums.com/product.htm#blackwood
 Management of Blackwood in Plantations 

melanoxylon
Fabales of Australia
Trees of Australia
Flora of Queensland
Flora of New South Wales
Flora of Victoria (Australia)
Flora of Tasmania
Medicinal plants of Australia
Garden plants of Australia
Ornamental trees